Harry Emanuel Kress Huston (October 14, 1883 –  October 16, 1969) was an American professional baseball player and college football coach.

Baseball career

University of Kansas
Huston played for the University of Kansas baseball team in Lawrence, Kansas from 1902 until 1906.

Philadelphia Phillies

Huston made his major league debut as a catcher with the Philadelphia Phillies on September 3, 1906 and played his final major league game on September 19, 1906. His teammates included Hall of Famers Hugh Duffy and Kid Nichols. His short professional career consisted of four at bats, no hits, and one base on balls. He continued to pursue his baseball career in the minor leagues and he had previously played professionally under an assumed name of "Corbin" so he could continue to play in college as well.

Coaching career
Huston was the second football coach at Southwestern College in Winfield, Kansas and held that position for one year, coaching the 1905 season. His coaching record at Southwesterns was 3–4.

Head coaching record

References

External links

 

1883 births
1969 deaths
Major League Baseball catchers
Kansas Jayhawks baseball players
Philadelphia Phillies players
Southwestern Moundbuilders football coaches
Austin Senators players
Chillicothe Babes players
Hamilton Maroons players
Lowell Tigers players
McKeesport Tubers players
Topeka Jayhawks players
Wheeling Stogies players
Zanesville Potters players
People from Bellefontaine, Ohio
Baseball players from Ohio
Kansas City Blue Stockings players